John Pigott (c. 1550 – by 1627), of Gray's Inn, London and Edlesborough, Buckinghamshire, was an English politician.

He was a younger son of Francis Pigott of Stratton, Bedfordshire and educated at St John’s College, Cambridge and Gray's Inn, where he was called to the bar in 1581.

He was a Member (MP) of the Parliament of England for Bedford in  1589 and 1593 and for Bodmin in 1601.

He married twice and left 2 sons and 6 daughters.

References

1550s births
1620s deaths
People from Buckinghamshire
Alumni of St John's College, Cambridge
Members of Gray's Inn
Members of the Parliament of England for Bodmin
English MPs 1589
English MPs 1593
English MPs 1601